Saint-Thibaud-de-Couz is a commune of the Savoie department in the Auvergne-Rhône-Alpes region in south-eastern France.

Geography
The village of Saint-Thibaud-de-Couz is located in the middle valley of the Hyères between Mont Grêle (1425 m) and Mont Outheran (1,676 m). Forests cover half of the township. The township is part of the Communauté de communes Cœur de Chartreuse.

Toponymy 
In the eleventh century, a Breton monk named Theobaldus built for pilgrims and travelers a "Hostellerie priory", at a place called Pre Chartreux between the Gencourt and the Poulemonts. Theobaldus gave the town its name (Thibaud), we called then the town under the name of Saint Thibaud.

Full name Saint-Thibaud-de-Couz is mentioned for the first time in Latin in 1497 in the cartulary Labaudie "Parrochia Sancti theobaldi de Couz". The name Couz, which means "pass" was used to refer to the Hyères valley until the Caves parade.

History
After the planning of the caves parade by Charles Emmanuel II in 1670, crossing of the marshes of Saint-Thibaud-de-Couz located in the plain was still a real problem. Many travelers complained to the authorities; there was even, say, three people mired with their carriage in 1684. It was the draining of wetlands under Napoleon that allowed to borrow road Chambéry - Lyon without much difficulties.

In the late 1990s, excavations have revealed traces of prehistoric occupation, dating from the late high Palaeolithic (12 000 years BC.)

Policy and administration

Population and society

Demographics
In 2011, the municipality had 975 inhabitants.

Cultural events and festivities

Media

Sports

Personalities
 Philibert II of Savoy 
 Charles Emmanuel II

Sights
 Church of Saint-Thibaud de Couz

See also
Communes of the Savoie department

References

External links

Official site

Communes of Savoie